Brazosport College (BC) is a public community college in Lake Jackson, Texas. The college was opened in 1968 and offers primarily associate degrees and some bachelor's degrees. The campus features The Clarion, a regional musical performance venue, in addition to the Brazosport Center for the Arts and Sciences which houses the Brazosport Museum of Natural Science as well as the Brazosport Planetarium among other institutions.

As defined by the Texas Legislature, the official service area of Brazosport College is the Brazosport, Columbia-Brazoria, Damon, and Sweeny school districts, and the Angleton Independent School District excluding that portion annexed by Alvin Community College prior to September 1, 1995. The service area includes most of Lake Jackson, Clute, Freeport, Jones Creek, Oyster Creek, Quintana, Richwood, and Surfside Beach.

History
In 1948, voters of the Brazosport Independent School District voted to create the Brazosport Junior College District.  However, not until the summer of 1967, after a tax was authorized by voters to maintain the college, was the college actually built.  In the Fall of 1968, the college opened as Brazosport Junior College, and the first semester of classes began with an enrollment of 868 students. Classes were held at the Brazosport Education Extension Center in Freeport, Texas.

In 1970, Brazosport Junior College graduated its first 25 students.  That same year, Brazosport Junior College was renamed to Brazosport College to represent a broader vision for the school. In 1996, President Millicent Valek was selected as the fourth president of the college.

On June 20, 2003, then Texas Governor Rick Perry signed Senate Bill 286 of the 78th Legislature into law, which created the pilot project.  The program allowed the Texas Higher Education Coordinating Board to choose Brazosport College along with Midland College, and South Texas College to offer baccalaureate degrees. In December 2004, Brazosport College received accreditation from the Southern Association of Colleges and Schools as a baccalaureate-level institution.  In the Fall of 2005, BC began offering classes for its Bachelor of Applied Technology degree program for the first time.

In 2011, Brazosport College, along with Frank Phillips College in Borger, Ranger College in Ranger, and Odessa College in Odessa, were proposed for closure by the State of Texas. The Texas Association of Community Colleges rallied successfully to keep the four institutions open.

In July 2014, Brazosport College expanded its baccalaureate programs by adding the Health Management Services major to its Bachelor of Applied Technology degree program.

In July 2021, Brazosport College received a $3 million gift from philanthropist MacKenzie Scott in recognition to their service to minority communities.

List of Brazosport College presidents
J. R. Jackson, 1968–1978
W. A. Bass, 1978–1988
John R. Grable, 1988–1996
Millicent Valek, 1996–2021
Vincent Solis, 2022-present

Academics
There are several divisions that comprise the college as follows:

 Division of Communication & Fine Arts
 Division of Computer Technology & Office Administration
 Division of Construction and Mechanical Technologies
 Division of Mathematics & Life Sciences
 Division of Physical Sciences & Process Technologies
 Division of Social Sciences & Business
 Department of Transitional Education

Associate degrees and transfer programs
Students at BC have the option to pursue several educational paths.  Historically, most students have opted to attend classes at Brazosport College as a stepping stone to other colleges and universities that offer bachelor's degrees.  BC participates in the Texas Common Course Numbering System, or TCCNS, a voluntary cooperative effort by many Texas colleges and universities to create a standard set of course designations for transfer students at the freshman and sophomore level.  This allows students who wish to transfer courses taken at Brazosport College to take a relevant curriculum for their destination school.

Another option for students at BC is to pursue an associate degree.  Brazosport College generally graduates around 200 students annually.

Bachelor's degree

A third option for students at BC is to pursue a Bachelor's degree in the school's Bachelor of Applied Technology program. Students in this program must be admitted through a separate application process than other students enrolled.

Campus

It is a fully commuter-based campus, as there are no housing facilities for students. Most classes are held in a central complex.

Facilities
Brazosport College is home to The Clarion—a  performance hall that seats 600. The $7.36 million facility was opened in October 2005. Notable artists that have performed at The Clarion include singer-songwriters Don McLean, Lyle Lovett, David Sanborn, Aaron Neville, Christopher Cross, Vince Gill, Rick Springfield, and Los Lonely Boys. The Clarion has had only one administrator since its construction, Vorin Dornan, who is still the current administrator.

The Brazosport Center for the Arts and Sciences, a  facility dedicated to arts and sciences is located directly in front of Brazosport College.   Hosted by the college on college land, the Brazosport Center for the Arts and Sciences is an independent nonprofit corporation. The center houses Brazosport Center Stages, an art studio and gallery, The Brazosport Museum of Natural Science along with a nature center and planetarium.

BC has a student activity center known as "The Swamp".  Students can play pool, table tennis, and participate in other activities.  The college also has a central dining facility that serves meals throughout the day to visitors, students, and staff and faculty.

Student life
Brazosport College's Student Senate are elected and represent BC's student body interests.  Other activities for students include a fencing club and a performing drama group.

Notable alumni
Candace Duval, class of 1981, former Democratic nominee to the U.S. House of Representatives
Robert Ellis, last attended in 2006, singer-songwriter

References

External links 

 Official website

Buildings and structures in Brazoria County, Texas
Education in Brazoria County, Texas
Greater Houston
Educational institutions established in 1968
Universities and colleges accredited by the Southern Association of Colleges and Schools
Community colleges in Texas
Freeport, Texas